Cora campestris is a species of basidiolichen in the family Hygrophoraceae. It was formally described as a new species in 2016 by Manuela Dal Forno, Sionara Eliasaro, and Adriano Afonso Spielmann. The specific epithet campestris refers to its habitat in the high-altitude fields (campos de altitude) of southeastern Brazil, where it grows on exposed rock outcrops.

References

campestris
Lichen species
Lichens described in 2016
Lichens of Southeast Brazil
Basidiolichens